Henry Gibson (born James Bateman; September 21, 1935 – September 14, 2009) was an American actor, comedian and poet. His best-known roles include his time as a cast member of the TV sketch-comedy series Rowan & Martin's Laugh-In from 1968 to 1971, the voice for the protagonist Wilbur in the 1973 animated film Charlotte's Web, his portrayal of country star Haven Hamilton in Robert Altman's 1975 film Nashville, as the Illinois Nazi leader in the 1980 film The Blues Brothers, and in his performance opposite Tom Hanks in 1989's The 'Burbs.

Early life
Gibson was born September 21, 1935, in Germantown, Philadelphia, the sixth of seven children of Edmund Alberts Bateman and his wife Dorothy (née Cassidy). He attended Saint Joseph's Preparatory School, where he was president of the drama club.

After graduating from the Catholic University of America in Washington, D.C., he served as an intelligence officer in the United States Air Force with the 66th Tactical Reconnaissance Wing in France from 1957 to 1960. Early in his career as a professional entertainer, he developed a comedy act in which he played a poet from Fairhope, Alabama. He adopted the stage name Henry Gibson, which is a same-sounding phrase for the name of famed Norwegian dramatist Henrik Ibsen. He also is known to have used the name Olsen Gibson.

Career
Gibson begin his acting career at the age of eight years old as a touring performer for the Mae Desmond Theatre for nine years. He appeared in many stage and theater productions. Gibson made many appearances on Tonight Starring Jack Paar between 1957 and 1962, often reciting his poetry. In 1962, his appearance coincided with guest-host Jerry Lewis. Lewis, charmed by Gibson's demeanor, subsequently cast him in The Nutty Professor (1963). Gibson's career took off following this film appearance. That was followed in 1964 by his poetry-reciting cowboy character Quirt Manly on the popular show The Beverly Hillbillies. Around this time, Gibson appeared in an episode of My Favorite Martian.

Gibson spent three years as part of the Laugh-In television show's cast, where he was nominated for a Golden Globe in 1971. He often played "The Poet", reciting poems with "sharp satirical or political themes". Gibson would emerge from behind a stage flat, wearing a Nehru jacket and "hippie" beads and holding an outlandishly large artificial flower. He would bow stiffly from the waist, state "[Title of poem] — by Henry Gibson" in an ironic Southern U.S. accent, again bow stiffly from the waist, recite his poem and return behind the flat. Gibson's routine was so memorable that John Wayne actually performed it once in his own inimitable style: "The Sky — by John Wayne. The Sky is blue/The Grass is green/Get off your butt/And join the Marine(s)!", whereupon Wayne left the scene by smashing through the flat. Gibson also regularly appeared in the "Cocktail Party" segments as a Catholic priest, sipping tea. He would put the cup on the saucer, recite his one-liner in a grave and somber tone, then go back to sipping tea. In 1962, Gibson had issued a comedy album on Liberty records, titled Alligator. The album was rereleased in 1968, now titled ...by Henry Gibson, following his success on Laugh-In. The liner notes perpetuated the origin story of his being a country boy from Fairhope, Alabama. The album did not reach the Billboard Top 200 in either release. In 1968, Gibson appeared on the television show Bewitched as Napoleon Bonaparte. He appeared on Bewitched in 1970 as Tim O'Shanter, a leprechaun.  Around this time, Gibson also made recurring appearances in the 1969–1974 anthology Love, American Style.

During the 1960s, Gibson had appeared on The Dick Van Dyke Show reading the poem "Keep a-Goin", which he later turned into a song in the Robert Altman movie Nashville (1975). Notably, he was nominated for a Golden Globe Award for his portrayal of Haven Hamilton in the film and won the National Society of Film Critics award for the role. The Nashville Tennessean called Gibson "the male superstar most surely to be in line for an Academy Award" and hailed his performance as being "so real to Music Row habitués as to be frightening." Gibson appeared in three other films directed by Altman: The Long Goodbye (starring Elliott Gould), A Perfect Couple, and Health.

In 1978, he appeared in The New Adventures Of Wonder Woman as the arch-villain Mariposa. Two years later, he appeared on The Dukes of Hazzard as Will Jason (Squirt) in the second-season episode "Find Loretta Lynn". The same year, he played the leader of the "Illinois Nazis" in the John Landis film The Blues Brothers; this became one of his better-known film roles. The next year, he appeared in The Incredible Shrinking Woman.

In the 1989 Joe Dante comedy The 'Burbs, starring Tom Hanks, Gibson played the villain. He reunited with director Dante a year later when Gremlins 2: The New Batch was released in 1990, performing a cameo as the office worker who is caught taking a smoking break on camera and fired by the sadistic boss. 1996 saw him playing an unusual dramatic role as former train conductor Robinson in the independent film Color of a Brisk and Leaping Day with Michael Stipe. That year, he was also the voice of Adolf Eichmann in Keith Gordon's film adaptation of Kurt Vonnegut's novel Mother Night. During 1999, Gibson made an appearance in Paul Thomas Anderson's Magnolia as an eccentric barfly who antagonizes former child prodigy Donnie Smith, played by William H. Macy.

Gibson also worked frequently as a voice actor in animation, most notably portraying Wilbur the pig in the popular Hanna-Barbera children's movie Charlotte's Web (1973). He later worked for the company again on the cartoon The Biskitts. Additionally, Gibson's voice work was featured on The Grim Adventures of Billy & Mandy as Lord Pain, King of the Hill as reporter Bob Jenkins, and Rocket Power as grouchy neighbor Merv Stimpleton.

Later television work included a guest role on Star Trek: Deep Space Nine playing the Ferengi Nilva in the 1998 episode "Profit and Lace". Gibson also had a leading role in a season 5 episode of Stargate SG-1 entitled "The Sentinel" as the character Marul. His last major roles were in the 2005 film Wedding Crashers as Father O'Neil, and on the television show Boston Legal as supporting character Judge Clark Brown.

Personal life and death
On April 6, 1966, Gibson married Lois Joan Geiger. They had three sons together – Jonathan David Gibson, an executive at Universal Pictures; Charles Alexander Gibson, a director and visual effects supervisor; and James Gibson, a screenwriter. Lois died on May 6, 2007, at age 77.

Gibson died of cancer on September 14, 2009, at his home in Malibu, California, a week before his 74th birthday. He was cremated at Westwood Village Memorial Park Cemetery, and his ashes were given to his family.

Filmography

Film

Television

Discography
The Alligator (1962)
The Grass Menagerie (1968)

Books
A Flower Child's Garden of Verses (1970)

Awards and nominations

References

External links
 
 Obituary at the Daily Telegraph

1935 births
2009 deaths
Male actors from Philadelphia
American male film actors
American male television actors
American male comedians
20th-century American comedians
21st-century American comedians
American sketch comedians
American male voice actors
American male musical theatre actors
American male poets
Deaths from cancer
Deaths from cancer in California
St. Joseph's Preparatory School alumni
Catholic University of America alumni
People from Greater Los Angeles
United States Air Force officers
20th-century American male actors
21st-century American male actors